Monfalcone is a coastal town in Northern Italy, on the Gulf of Trieste.

Monfalcone may also refer to:

 Monfalcone railway station
 A.S.D. Unione Fincantieri Monfalcone, a soccer team in Monfalcone
 Alfred M. Monfalcone, mayor of Newport News, Virginia in 1956

See also 
 Montefalcone (disambiguation)

Surnames of Italian origin